Draw Pictures is a production company, with branches based in London and Los Angeles. They have directed music videos for artists such as Depeche Mode, Fall Out Boy, Franz Ferdinand, Girls Aloud, Mark Ronson, The Bravery, Bad Religion, The Shins, Bob Dylan, and Stereophonics. They have also filmed commercials and virals for Converse, Helio, Hilton Hotels, Levi's, MTV, Ford, and PlayStation, and many others.
The company was founded by Exec producers Phil Tidy and Patrick Holtkamp and video rep Joceline Gabriel in 2004 and soon became one of the most prolific production companies in London. An office in Los Angeles followed a few years later. 
The Draw Pictures team also launched a specialist animation shop called DirtyUK in 2005 and digital agency WAX in 2007 specialising in Viral, Content and Social Media advertising.

Directors
12Foot6
Ben Rollason
Ben Unwin
Caswell Coggins
Devon Dickson
Dirty UK
Frank Borin
Goodtimes Moving Images Ltd
JT
Matt Lenski
Michael
Michael Williams
Nicola Mills
Parasol Island
Petro
Remi Weekes
Rupert Jones
Simon Gargette
Titus Twister
Uli Meyer
Uwe Flade

Music videos
Beverley Knight – "Come as You Are" (2004)
Fall Out Boy – "Sugar, We're Goin Down" (2005)
Shayne Ward – "That's My Goal" (2005)
The Feeling – "Sewn" (2006)
Boy Kill Boy – "Suzie" (2006)
Alesha Dixon – "Knockdown" (2006)
Regina Spektor – "On the Radio" (2006)
Keane – "A Bad Dream" (2007)
Mumm-Ra – "What Would Steve Do?" (2007)
Mark Ronson – "Stop Me" (2007)
Dame Shirley Bassey – "The Living Tree" (2007)
Band of Horses – "The Funeral" (2007)
The Academy Is... – "Everything We Had" (2007)
The Go! Team – "Grip Like a Vice" (2007)
Natalie Imbruglia – "Glorious" (2007)
 Bad Religion – "New Dark Ages" (2007)
 The Shins – "Turn on Me" (2007)
Bob Dylan – "Most Likely You Go Your Way (And I'll Go Mine)" (Mark Ronson Remix) (2007)
Orson – "Ain't No Party" (2007)
Blood Red Shoes – "I Wish I Was Someone Better" (2007)
Simple Plan – "When I'm Gone" (2007)
Delays – "Love Made Visible" (2007)
Cheri Dennis – "Portrait of Love" (2007)
Girls Aloud – "Can't Speak French" (2008)
The Bravery – "Believe" (2008)
Elliot Minor – "Parallel Worlds" (2008)
Martin Garrix – "Don't look down" (2015)

References

External links
DrawPictures.co.uk
Draw Pictures at mvdbase.com

Music video directors